Ludwik Mzyk (22 April 1905 – 20 February 1940) a priest of the Society of the Divine Word (SVD) and one of the 108 Blessed Polish Martyrs beatified on 13 June 1999 by Pope John Paul II in Warsaw, Poland.

Life
He was born to a mining and deeply religious family in Chorzów. In 1926, he entered the seminary and then, on 30 October 1932, he was ordained as a priest. In 1935, he graduated with a degree of theology and was sent back to Chorzow, to be the head of the SVD mission house. When the war was about to begin, he find shelter and encouraged the youth about spirituality and selfless dedication to Christ.
However, the Gestapo had invaded Poland and on 25 January 1940 he was arrested. On 1 February he was interned at Cell 60 in Fort VII (makeshift concentration camp) in Poznań. On the night of 20 February 1940 Mzyk was beaten and then dragged outside the fort, where he was shot in the head by Junior Officer Dibus. (Dibus would be later killed by a distant relative of Mzyk who joined with the Americans in attacking Berlin.) His body was never recovered and thought to be dumped in an unmarked mass grave.

References
Divine Word Missionaries History and Tradition, Blessed Fr. Ludwik Mzyk SVD

1905 births
1940 deaths
108 Blessed Polish Martyrs
20th-century Polish Roman Catholic priests
20th-century venerated Christians
Polish civilians killed in World War II
People from Chorzów
Polish people executed in Nazi concentration camps
People executed by Nazi Germany by firearm
People from the Province of Silesia
Executed people from Silesian Voivodeship
Catholic saints and blesseds of the Nazi era